The 2015–16 Eerste Divisie, known as Jupiler League for sponsorship reasons, is the sixtieth season of Eerste Divisie since its establishment in 1955. It began in August 2015 with the first matches of the season and ended in May 2016 with the finals of the promotion/relegation play-offs, also involving the 16th- and 17th-placed teams from the 2015–16 Eredivisie.

This season was the last where promotion and relegation was optional. No club was relegated to the new third-tier division Tweede Divisie (Second Division). This change in the league system was approved in a KNVB assembly in December 2014. Thus, the Topklasse and leagues below it were reduced by one level, and furthermore, promotion and relegation between the Eerste Divisie and Tweede Divisie became mandatory from 2016–17.

Teams
A total of 19 teams took part in the league. 2014–15 Eerste Divisie champion NEC gained promotion to the Eredivisie, and was replaced by Dordrecht, which finished last in the 2014–15 Eredivisie. Roda JC Kerkrade and De Graafschap won the post-season playoff, and were replaced in the 2015–16 Eerste Divisie by NAC Breda and Go Ahead Eagles. No teams were relegated, but Jong FC Twente voluntarily withdrew from the league.

Personnel and kits

League table

Results

Play-offs

Promotion/relegation play-offs
Ten teams, two from the Eredivisie and eight from the Eerste Divisie, play for two spots in the 2016–17 Eredivisie, the remaining eight teams play in the 2016–17 Eerste Divisie.

Key: * = Play-off winners, (a) = Wins because of away goals rule, (e) = Wins after extra time in second leg, (p) = Wins after penalty shoot-out.

References

External links
 

Eerste Divisie seasons
Netherlands 2
2015–16 in Dutch football